Mark Henry Hentemann is an American screenwriter, creator and producer for television and film. He is a writer, executive producer and former showrunner of the animated series Family Guy, where he started as a writer in its first season. In addition, Hentemann has also provided voices for many minor characters on Family Guy, including the "Phony Guy", Opie, and Eddie the Ostrich.

Hentemann has also written for the Late Show with David Letterman, created the series 3 South for MTV, and also the animated series, Bordertown for Fox in 2016 on the network's Sunday Funday lineup, which Seth MacFarlane and he executive produced.  He is currently working on a reboot of The Naked Gun franchise for Paramount.

Hentemann is also a long-time real estate investor.  Having moved to Los Angeles penniless in 1998, he began investing his script earnings into multifamily.  He is founder of Quantum Capital, an investment firm.

Career
Hentemann grew up in Albuquerque, New Mexico, and began his career as a greeting card writer and illustrator for American Greetings. His cards caught the interest of David Letterman and allowed him his first job in television writing for The Late Show.

Mark Hentemann has written, produced and provided voice acting on several half-hours, including "Off-Centre" (WBTV), "Run of the House" (WBTV) 3 South, which he created for MTV.  He also created the animated series Bordertown for FOX, on which he voice acted, created and executive produced.

Hentemann has twice been nominated for a Primetime Emmy Award (including a nomination for Outstanding Comedy Series).

Hentemann is also a long time real estate investor. He is co-founder of the investment company Quantum Capital, which invests in multifamily real estate in Los Angeles, Austin and Denver, with $130,000,000 in assets under management.

Personal life 
Mark Hentemann lives in Los Angeles, CA with his wife, Lynne, and has three children, Tatum (b. 2004), Grace (b. 2008), and Emerson (b. 2008). Tatum, does occasional voices for Family Guy and American Dad!.  Hentemann's daughter Grace played the live-action version of Stewie Griffin in the Family Guy episode "Road to the Multiverse".  She wears red overalls and is seated next to the live-action Brian Griffin, played by writer Wellesley Wild's dog.  Wild is the writer of the episode.  Hentemann attended Albuquerque La Cueva High School and Miami University..

Filmography

Voice Acting - Television

Writing credits

As Executive Producer

Video games

Awards

Primetime Emmy Awards

References

External links

Quantumcapitalinc.com

1969 births
Television producers from Ohio
American television writers
American male television writers
American male voice actors
Living people
Writers from Cleveland
Miami University alumni
Screenwriters from Ohio